The 1955 Individual Speedway World Championship was the tenth edition of the official World Championship to determine the world champion rider.

In a very competitive World final Peter Craven of England finished one point ahead of three other riders who had to ride off for the silver medal. The defending champion Ronnie Moore won the ride off to claim silver from fellow countryman Barry Briggs and Welshman Eric Williams who both crashed leaving Moore an easy victory, Briggs took third place from Williams who missed out on a medal.

Nordic Final
8 June 1955
 Trondheim
 First 6 to European final

Continental Final
13 June 1955
 Abensberg
 First 6 to European Final

Championship Round
Venues
7 events in Great Britain

Scores
First 12 to World final + 2 reserves

European Final
4 July 1955
 Oslo
 First 4 to World final

World final
15 September 1955
 London, Wembley Stadium

Note - Aub Lawson withdrew injured, Doug Davies withdrew with meningitis,

Classification

References

1955
Individual World Championship
Individual Speedway World Championship, 1955
Individual Speedway World Championship
Individual Speedway World Championship
Individual Speedway World Championship
Individual Speedway World Championship
Individual Speedway World Championship
Speedway competitions in the United Kingdom